Vaughan L. Wilson (born December 24, 1976) is an American actor best known for playing the role of "Fergie Thompson" on the CW's hit show One Tree Hill. He has most recently worked on the film (not yet released) "Bolden", and is the lead in adult comedy show "Vaughan" based very loosely on his life as a struggling actor (currently streaming on Amazon Video).  He was born, and resides in, Wilmington, North Carolina.

External links

1976 births
Living people
American male television actors